Henry Nicholas de la Poer Beresford, 9th Marquess of Waterford (born 23 March 1958), is an Anglo-Irish peer.

Biography
Lord Waterford is the son of the 8th Marquess of Waterford and Lady Caroline Olein Geraldine Wyndham-Quin, daughter of the 6th Earl of Dunraven and Mount-Earl, and inherited his title and estate at Curraghmore, County Waterford, upon his father's death in February 2015. Before inheriting the marquessate, he was styled Earl of Tyrone, and managed farms, stables and polo teams in Great Britain.

Family
Lord Waterford, then known as Lord Tyrone, married Amanda Thompson in 1986. Lord and Lady Waterford have three children:
 Richard John de la Poer Beresford, Earl of Tyrone (born 19 August 1987), known as Richard le Poer or Richard Tyrone married in 2017 Dr Flora Richardson, granddaughter of Sir Michael Richardson, and has issue, one daughter. 
 Lord Marcus Patrick de la Poer Beresford (born 1990)
 Lady Camilla Juliet de la Poer Beresford, (born 25 July 1995)

References

1958 births
Living people
Place of birth missing (living people)
9